Eriba-Adad, inscribed mSU-dIM or  mSU-d10 ("[the god] Adad has replaced"), was king of Assyria from  1390 BC to 1364 BC. His father had been the earlier king Aššur-bel-nišešu, an affiliation attested in brick inscriptions, king-lists and a tablet although a single king list gives his father as Aššur-rā’im-nišēšu, probably in error. He succeeded his nephew, Aššur-nādin-aḫḫe II, being succeeded himself by the rather more prominent king Aššur-uballiṭ I, who was his son. He was the 72nd on the Assyrian King List and ruled for 27 years.

Biography

The circumstances surrounding his accession are unknown, although most nephew-uncle successions recorded in Assyrian history were bloody affairs. He styled himself “regent of Enlil”, the first Assyrian monarch to do so since Šamši-Adad I. His uninscribed royal seal shows a heraldic group which includes two winged griffin-demons flanking a small tree and supporting a winged sun-disc above their wings and a double-headed griffin-demon holding two griffin-demons by their ankles, a radical departure from the earlier style, which was to set a precedent for the later Assyrian glyptic. It was found impressed into middle Assyrian contract tablets.

He probably began his reign overshadowed by  the powerful Mitanni. However, the Mitanni Empire became entangled in a dynastic battle between Tushratta and his brother Artatama II, and after this, his son Shuttarna III, who called himself king of the Hurri, while seeking support from the Assyrians. A pro-Assur faction appeared at the royal Mitanni court, which enabled Assyria to finally break Mitanni influence upon Assyria, and in turn make Assyria an influence on Mitanni. His son and successor Ashur-uballiṭ I  would take full advantage of this and destroy the Mitanni Empire.

Several of the Limmu officials, the noblemen from which the Assyrian Eponym dating system was derived, are known for this period as they date commercial records, but relatively few can be assigned directly to Eriba-Adad's reign rather than that of his successor. One official might be Aššur-muttakil, (the governor of Qabra, a fortress on the lesser Zab), who inherited his position from his father Aššur-dayyān and bequeathed it to his son. Eriba-Adad I's stela was the earliest of the stelae identified in the Stelenriehe, "row of stelae," the two rows of stone monuments uncovered in Aššur. The later Assyrian king, Ninurta-apal-Ekur, son of Ilī-padâ, was to claim descent from him in his inscriptions.

Inscriptions

References

14th-century BC Assyrian kings
Year of birth unknown

Year of death unknown